The 29th Japan Record Awards were held in 1987. They recognized accomplishments by musicians from the previous year.

Award winners 
Japan Record Award:
Masahiko Kondo for "Orokamono"
Best Vocalist:
Miyako Otsuki
Best New Artist:
Risa Tachibana
Best Album:
Tsuyoshi Nagabuchi for "LICENSE"

External links
Official Website

Japan Record Awards
Japan Record Awards
Japan Record Awards
Japan Record Awards
1987